Marriotts Ridge High School is a public secondary school located in Marriottsville, Maryland, United States. It is part of the Howard County Public School System. The school was named after the town of Marriottsville, and the height of its location. The pre-opening name of  Marriott's Ridge was later changed to Marriotts Ridge.

The school is located in northern Howard County on Maryland Route 99, just east of Maryland Route 32, and north of Interstate 70. It is approximately 15 miles west of Baltimore and 25 miles north of Washington, DC. The school was planned to be built on the grounds of the Alpha Ridge Landfill, but a 3–2 council vote in 2002 redirected the building to a site across from Mount View Middle School.  Marriotts Ridge is a mirror image of both Long Reach High School and Reservoir High School. The school borders the districts for Glenelg High School, River Hill High School, Wilde Lake High School, Centennial High School, and Mount Hebron High School. In 2015, U.S. News & World Report ranked Marriotts Ridge as the  265 best high school nationwide and No. 7 statewide on its list of "America's Best High Schools".

Academics, rankings, achievements

Like other Howard County high schools, Marriotts Ridge High School consistently ranks as one of the best high schools in the state of Maryland and the nation. Marriotts Ridge is also often ranked among the top of Howard County’s high schools. The school is currently ranked as the 12th best high school in Maryland and #628 in the nation by U.S. News & World Report.

Achievements in the 2010 school year include:
Overall Grand Champion in Choir, Orchestra, and Band at East Coast Fiesta Val Music Competition
Poms – State Champions

Principals
 Pat Saunderson 2005–2011
Adrianne Kaufman 2011–2016
Tammy Goldeisen 2016–2022
Dr. John DiPaula 2022-present

Athletics
Marriotts Ridge has won the following titles:

Boys' soccer
2013 Boys' Soccer – County Champions
2012 Boys' Soccer – County, Regional, State Champions, Undefeated (17–0)
2011 Boys' Soccer – Regional, State Champions
2010 Boys' Soccer –  Regional, State Champions
2009 Boys' Soccer – County, District, Regional, State Champions
2008 Boys' Soccer – County, Regional Champions

Cheerleading
Winter 2018-19 Cheerleading – County Champions
Winter 2012–13 Cheerleading – County Champions
Winter 2011–12 Cheerleading – County Champions
Winter 2009–10 Cheerleading – County Champions

Football 

2019 Boys' Football – County Champions

Girls' soccer
2010 Girls' Soccer – County Champions
2013 Girls' Soccer – Regional Champions
2022 Girls' Soccer - County Champions

Golf
2017 Golf - State Champions, Individual Girl, Individual Boy, and Team Champions (Triple Crown)
2016 Golf - State Champions, Boys' Team Undefeated
2015 Golf - State Champions, Boys' Team Undefeated
2014 Golf – State Champions, Boys' Team Undefeated
2013 Golf – State Champions, Undefeated
2012 Golf – State Champions
2011 Golf – Girls' County Champions
2010 Golf – District Champions

Lacrosse
2022 Girls' Lacrosse- State Champions
2022 Girls' Lacrosse- Regional Champions
2021 Girls' Lacrosse – State Champions
2021 Boys' Lacrosse - Regional Champions
2018 Boys' Lacrosse - State Champions
2017 Boys' Lacrosse - County Champions
2014 Girls' Lacrosse – State Champions
2013 Girls' Lacrosse – State Champions
2013 Girls' Lacrosse – Regional Champions
2011 Girls' Lacrosse – State Champions (The MRHS Girls Varsity lacrosse team won the Maryland state title in 2011 by a score of 8–4 against Century High School.)
2010 Girls' Lacrosse – Regional Champions
2007 Boys Lacrosse- Regional Champions

Ice hockey
2019 Serio Cup Champions
2018 Serio Cup qualifiers - Lost to Glenelg High School
2017 Serio (Howard) Cup Champions
2017 MSHL State Finalist
2017 USA Hockey Nationals Qualifier – High School Division
2016 USA Hockey Nationals Qualifier – High School Division
2015 Howard Cup Champions
2011 Howard Cup Champions

Robotics
2012 State Alliance Champions
2012–2015  Regional Champions

Volleyball
2014 Volleyball – Regional Champions
2011 Volleyball – Regional Champions
2010 Volleyball – Regional Champions

Incidents

 On February 3, 2017 at approximately 7:15 am, 10 minutes before school started, Marriotts Ridge High School was evacuated when a trash-can fire broke out in the boys' bathroom, apparently with an initial start from a paper towel holder. No one was injured. As a result of the fire, students were sheltered at the nearby Mount View Middle School and classes were dismissed at 10:15 am. Howard schools spokesman John White said the fire was caused by a student and that disciplinary actions will follow, using the school system's Student Code of Conduct.'

Club and Activities

Computer Science Club 
The MRHS Computer Science Club (founded 2019) teaches and assists students with computer science and programming, getting young students interested in the field of computer science. Members learn how to develop and build software projects and solve programming puzzles. With over 100 members, the Computer Science Club is one of the school's largest clubs.

It's Academic 
The MRHS It's Academic team meets weekly throughout the school year to train for competition in regional academic competitions. Student participants should be committed to academic excellence, capable of working in a team setting, and confident in their knowledge. The widespread academic setting constantly enriches members in becoming very knowledgeable in numerous topics of general knowledge. Tournaments participated in throughout the year consist of: National History Bowl, Johns Hopkins QuizBowl NAQT QuizBowl, and various Howard County-organized events.

Journalism 
MRHS publishes The Stallion, a student-led newspaper with monthly issues. Student journalists cover topics in local news, opinion, sports, features, and creative writing.

Science Olympiad 
The Science Olympiad club prepares students for and participates in regional Science Olympiad competitions.

Students
The 2019–20 school year was the fifteenth anniversary of the school. The class of 2008 was the first graduating class of Marriotts Ridge High School. Marriotts Ridge is known for its strong academics with a drop out rate of .46% and 100% of students passing the Maryland High School assessment in the 2009–2010 school year. Marriotts Ridge has been ranked 14th out of 225 public high schools in Maryland.

Demographics

Listed below is the data collected from the 2019–20 school year regarding the student body's ethnic breakdown.

See also
 Howard County Public Schools

References and notes

External links

Marriotts Ridge High school
Howard County Public School System
Marriotts Ridge High School via Google Maps

2005 establishments in Maryland
Educational institutions established in 2005
Marriottsville, Maryland
Public high schools in Maryland
Public schools in Howard County, Maryland